Calico Life Sciences LLC is an Alphabet subsidiary responsible for health research and development, life sciences and biotechnology. Originating on September 18, 2013 prior to the Google restructuring and headed by Bill Maris with the goal of combating aging and diseases of aging, it was incorporated into Alphabet with Google's other sister divisions in 2015.

In Google's 2013 Founders Letter, Larry Page described Calico as a company focused on "health, well-being, and longevity" and the company's name additionally as a play on "California Life Company."

Partnerships and staff 
In September 2014, it was announced that Calico, in partnership with AbbVie, would be opening up an R&D facility focused on aging and age-related diseases, such as neurodegeneration and cancer. Initially, each company will invest $350 million, with an option for each to add an extra $500 million later on. In the same month, Calico announced a partnership with the University of Texas Southwestern Medical Center and 2M Companies regarding drug development for neurodegenerative disorders.

In 2015, the Broad Institute of MIT and Harvard announced a partnership with Calico to "advance research on age-related diseases and therapeutics", a further partnership also was announced with the Buck Institute for Research on Aging. Also in 2015, Calico announced a partnership with QB3 based on researching the biology of aging and identifying potential therapeutics for age-related diseases and one with AncestryDNA based on conducting research into the genetics of human lifespan.

At the end of 2017 and the beginning of 2018, Calico lost two top scientists; in December 2017 Hal Barron, its head of R&D, left for GlaxoSmithKline, and in March 2018 Daphne Koller, who was leading their AI efforts, left to pursue a venture in applying machine learning techniques to drug design.

Reception 
Aubrey de Grey has criticized Calico in an interview in 2017, calling it a "massive disappointment". De Grey claimed that Calico is ignoring existing research on longevity, and instead focuses on understanding aging better. De Grey asserted that, among other people at the top, CSO David Botstein is responsible for this approach, being "a basic scientist through and through" who would therefore "never feel that we have enough knowledge".

The company was criticized for its secrecy, contrary to Google's "open culture" politics, and ineffectiveness given its huge budget.

See also 
 Verily
 Altos Labs
 SENS Research Foundation
 Human Longevity
 Life extension

References

External links
 

GV companies
Biogerontology organizations
Health care companies based in California
Biotechnology companies of the United States
Life sciences industry
Life extension organizations
American companies established in 2013
Biotechnology companies established in 2013
Alphabet Inc.
2013 establishments in California
Companies based in South San Francisco, California
Alphabet Inc. subsidiaries